Walter Kolneder (1 July 1910 – 30 January 1994) was an Austrian musicologist and violist.

Life and career 
Koldener was born in Wels, Upper Austria. From 1925 to 1935 he studied music with Bernhard Paumgartner (conducting), Theodor Müller (violin) and Friedrich Frischenschlager (composition) at the Mozarteum in Salzburg. He also attended a master class for viola with Max Strub and was a member of the Mozarteum orchestra (1929-1936). Privately he studied composition with Johann Nepomuk David in Wels from 1927 to 1929. In 1934/35, he began musicological studies at the University of Vienna.

In the post-war period, he was initially active as a conductor in Wels. He continued his studies with Wilhelm Fischer at the University of Innsbruck and in 1949 he was awarded the doctorate with his dissertation Die vokale Mehrstimmigkeit in der Volksmusik der österreichischen Alpenländer.

Kolneder taught at the Conservatoire de Luxembourg from 1953 to 1959. In 1956, he qualified as a professor of musicology with a thesis on Antonio Vivaldi at the Saarland University in Saarbrücken, where he became Privatdozent. From 1960 he also taught in Gießen. Between 1966 and 1972 he was rector of the Hochschule für Musik Karlsruhe. He became extraordinary professor for musicology at the University of Karlsruhe in 1966 and founded the Institute for Musicology. He retired in 1974.

Koldener was engaged in the history and repertoire of violin playing. He published studies on Antonio Vivaldi and Anton Webern. He also edited the complete edition of Tomaso Albinoni's instrumental music. Furthermore, he dedicated himself to the Austrian folk music. In addition, he published baroque instrumental music of the 17th and 18th century and its arrangements.

Koldener died in Karlsruhe at the age of 84.

Awards 
 1986: Kulturpreis des Landes Oberösterreich for music

Work 
 Aufführungspraxis bei Vivaldi. First published in 1955, New edition by Amadeus Verlag 1999, .
 Das Buch der Violine. Atlantis Musikbuch, .
 Antonio Vivaldi, Dokumente seines Lebens und Schaffens. Heinrichshofen, Wilhelmshaven, .
 Die Kunst der Fuge. Mythen des 20. Jahrhunderts. Heinrichshofen, Wilhelmshaven 1977, .
 Johann Sebastian Bach. Lebensbilder. Lübbe Verlag, .
 Lübbes Bach-Lexikon (Bastei-Lübbe-Taschenbuch Band 61288), Lübbe Verlag, Bergisch Gladbach 1994, .
 Musikinstrumentenkunde Ein Studien- und Prüfungshelfer. Heinrichshofen, Wilhelmshaven, .
 Geschichte der Musik. Ein Studien- und Prüfungshelfer. Heinrichshofen, Wilhelmshaven, .
 Schule des Generalbassspiels. Part I: The instrumental music.  First publication 1983, Heinrichshofen, Wilhelmshaven, .
 Singen nach Noten. Praktische Musiklehre für Chorsänger zum Erlernen des Vom-Blatt-Singens.

Further reading 
 Hans Heinrich Eggebrecht and Siegfried Schmalzriedt: Kolneder, Walter. In Grove Music Online (Englisch; subscription required).
 Elisabeth Th. Hilscher: Kolneder, Walter. In Oesterreichisches Musiklexikon. Online edition, Vienna 2002 ff., ; Printed edition: Volume 3, published by the Austrian Academy of Sciences, Vienna 2004, .
 Walter Kolneder: Kolneder, Walter. In Friedrich Blume (ed.): Die Musik in Geschichte und Gegenwart (MGG). First edition, volume 7 (Jensen – Kyrie). Bärenreiter/Metzler, Kassel among others 1958, DNB 550439609
 Wolfgang Suppan: Steirisches Musiklexikon. 2nd, completely revised and extended edition of the 1962-1966 edition, Akademische Druck- und Verlagsanstalt, Graz 2009, .
 Rudolf Vierhaus (ed.): Deutsche Biographische Enzyklopädie (DBE). Vol. 5: Hitz – Kozub. 2. revised and extended edition, K. G. Saur, Munich 2006, .

References

External links 
 
 
 Kolneder, Walter on 
 Walter Kolneder at Schott Music
 Walter Kolneder at HeBu Musikverlag

1910 births
1994 deaths
People from Wels
20th-century Austrian musicologists
Austrian classical violists
Academic staff of the Hochschule für Musik Karlsruhe
Academic staff of the Karlsruhe Institute of Technology
Academic staff of Saarland University
University of Innsbruck alumni
20th-century classical musicians
20th-century violists